The Falkland Islands general election of 1976 was held in 1976 to elect members to the Legislative Council. Four out of the ten Councillors were elected through universal suffrage, two from Stanley and one each from East Falkland and West Falkland. The election was delayed twice, first in November 1975 when the dissolution of the Legislative Council was postponed by ten weeks to 31 January 1976 and then again in January 1976 when it was postponed to 28 February 1976. This was done in the hope that the election would be held under the proposed new constitution and to allow the Falkland Islanders opportunity to study the report of the Select Committee before the election took place. In reality, the new constitution did not come into force until the following year, with the first election under the new constitution taking place in October 1977, just 15 months after the last election.

Results
Candidates in bold were elected.  Candidates in italic were incumbents.

Stanley constituency

East Falkland constituency

West Falkland constituency

References

1976 elections in South America
General election
1976
Non-partisan elections
February 1976 events in South America
1976 elections in the British Empire